Mohamed Fadhel Khalil (d. May 31, 2017) was a Tunisian businessman, politician and diplomat. He served as the Minister of Social Affairs from 1992 to 1996. He was also the Tunisian Ambassador to Syria, Algeria and Austria. Additionally, he was the chief executive officer of the Compagnie des phosphates de Gafsa, and the Governor of Kef Governorate (1981–1982), Jendouba Governorate (1987–1988), and Sfax (1988–1990).

References

Year of birth unknown
2017 deaths
Government ministers of Tunisia
Governors of Sfax Governorate
Governors of Jendouba Governorate
Governors of Kef Governorate
Governors of Tunisian governorates
Ambassadors of Tunisia to Algeria
Ambassadors of Tunisia to Austria
Ambassadors of Tunisia to Syria
20th-century Tunisian businesspeople
People from Sfax Governorate